Terrebonne High School is a high school in Houma, Louisiana. It is a part of the Terrebonne Parish School District.

History

In 1969 Southdown High School (originally Houma Colored High School), which educated black students in Terrebonne Parish, closed. Students were moved to Terrebonne High and South Terrebonne High School.

From 2015 to 2016 the Louisiana State Department of Education score for this school declined from 100.1 to 99.3; as an "A" level school makes 100 points or more, Terrebonne's rank fell from A to B.

In fall of 2017 the 9th grade is scheduled to have been moved from Houma Junior High School to Terrebonne High. In all other areas of Terrebonne Parish, 9th graders were at the high school level. From February 2017 until fall 2017 existing 9th grade students were reclassified as Terrebonne High students but continued to take classes in portable buildings at Houma Junior High.

Athletics
Terrebonne High athletics competes in the LHSAA.

Notable alumni
Sherman A. Bernard, Louisiana insurance commissioner from 1972 to 1988
Richie Cunningham, NFL placekicker.
Gordon Dove, Houma businessman and state representative
Hunt Downer, former Speaker of the Louisiana House of Representatives; first secretary of the Louisiana Veterans Affairs Department
Earl Gros, NFL running back
Wally Whitehurst, former MLB player (New York Mets, San Diego Padres, New York Yankees)
Justin Williams (baseball), MLB Player, St. Louis Cardinals

References

External links
 Terrebonne High School's Official Website

Houma, Louisiana
Public high schools in Louisiana
Schools in Terrebonne Parish, Louisiana